Merel de Blaeij (also spelled Blaey, born 2 December 1986) is a Dutch field hockey player. At the 2012 Summer Olympics, she competed for the Netherlands women's national field hockey team in the women's event.

References

External links 
 

1986 births
Living people
Dutch female field hockey players
Field hockey players at the 2012 Summer Olympics
Medalists at the 2012 Summer Olympics
Olympic field hockey players of the Netherlands
Olympic gold medalists for the Netherlands
Olympic medalists in field hockey
Field hockey players from The Hague
HC Klein Zwitserland players
20th-century Dutch women
20th-century Dutch people
21st-century Dutch women